INFORMS Journal on Applied Analytics is a bimonthly peer-reviewed academic journal about operations research that was established in 1970 under the title Interfaces by The Institute of Management Sciences, now part of the Institute for Operations Research and the Management Sciences. The journal's has a case-study style: it offers examples of how operations research theory has been applied in businesses and organizations.

An annual feature is an issue with papers by the previous year's Franz Edelman Award participants.

The journal was published quarterly from 1970 to 1982.

References

External links 
 

Business and management journals
Bimonthly journals
INFORMS academic journals
English-language journals
Publications established in 1970
Operations research